Steve Kuhn may refer to;

 Steve Kuhn, an American Jazz musician
 Steve Kuhn, founder of Major League Pickleball